Ministry of Finance and Economic Planning may refer to:

 Ministry of Finance and Economic Planning (Ghana)
 Ministry of Finance and Economic Planning (Rwanda)
 Ministry of Finance and Economic Planning (South Sudan)